Jayden Connor Stockley (born 15 September 1993) is an English professional footballer who plays as a striker for EFL League One side Fleetwood Town.

Career

AFC Bournemouth
Born in Poole, Dorset, Stockley started his career as a youth player at AFC Bournemouth. At the age of 16 years, manager Eddie Howe called him up to be a substitute for their match at home to Burton Albion on 26 September 2009, due to an injury crisis within the Bournemouth squad, and the block on Bournemouth's transfer activity as they owed money to HM Revenue and Customs. Howe needed permission from his school, as he had to miss exam preparation. Howe said; "I had to phone Jayden's school to get permission to let him play against Burton and I shall call them again to see if they'll let me have him on Tuesday".

He made his debut for Bournemouth on 6 October away against Northampton Town in their 2–1 defeat in the Football League Trophy. Stockley was the second youngest player to ever take to the field for Bournemouth. Responding to his age, he said; "At the end of the day, you have to get on with your job—it doesn't matter how old you are. There are no excuses. If Eddie thinks I am ready to come in now then I'm ready." Stockley made his debut in the Football League in Bournemouth's subsequent League Two game against Chesterfield on 10 October, replacing Ryan Garry as a substitute in the 89th minute. He signed a five-year contract with Bournemouth in November 2009. He joined Dorchester Town on loan for a month on 7 January 2011.

On 4 November 2011, it was announced Stockley had joined League Two club Accrington Stanley on an initial one-month loan deal. He returned to Bournemouth on 9 January, having made 10 appearances, scoring three goals. The following November, he joined Conference National side Woking on loan until January 2013. His loan was extended and carried on until the end of the season.

The next season, he was loaned to League One side Leyton Orient for a month. After making five appearances in all competitions for Orient, he had his loan extended on 8 October 2013 until 4 January 2014. He was recalled by Bournemouth on 28 November. He spent the second half of the 2013–14 season on loan at Torquay United.

On 7 January 2015, Stockley signed on loan for League Two side Luton Town. He returned to Bournemouth in April. The next season, Stockley signed on loan for Portsmouth, and also signed a new one-year contract with Bournemouth. He spent the second half of the season with Exeter City.

Aberdeen
In 2016, Stockley signed a pre-contract agreement with Scottish Premiership side Aberdeen. He made his debut on 30 June 2016, in a Europa League First qualifying round tie against Fola Esch. He scored his first goal for the club in the following round, in a 3–0 win against Ventspils. His final two matches for of the season were a league win over Rangers in which he was introduced as a substitute sent off for two bookings, and the 2017 Scottish Cup Final, a defeat to Celtic.

Exeter City
On transfer deadline day, 31 August 2017, Stockley signed for previous loan club Exeter City for a club record fee, believed to be £100,000. He went on to be a fan favourite with the Grecians, notching 51 goals in 98 appearances in all competitions before his departure in January 2019.

Preston North End
On 3 January 2019, Stockley signed for Preston North End for £750,000.

Charlton Athletic (loan)
On 22 January 2021, Stockley joined Charlton Athletic on loan for the rest of the 2020-21 season. He scored his first goal for Charlton in a 3-1 defeat to Portsmouth on 2 February 2021.

Charlton Athletic

On 15 June 2021, Stockley signed for Charlton Athletic for an undisclosed fee, signing a three-year deal.

Fleetwood Town

On 30 January 2023, Stockley joined Fleetwood Town for an undisclosed fee, signing on a two-and-a-half year deal.

Personal life
Stockley attended Lytchett Minster School in Poole, Dorset.

Career statistics

References

External links
AFC Bournemouth profile

Living people
1993 births
Sportspeople from Poole
Footballers from Dorset
English footballers
Association football forwards
AFC Bournemouth players
Dorchester Town F.C. players
Accrington Stanley F.C. players
Woking F.C. players
Leyton Orient F.C. players
Torquay United F.C. players
Cambridge United F.C. players
Luton Town F.C. players
Portsmouth F.C. players
Exeter City F.C. players
Preston North End F.C. players
Charlton Athletic F.C. players
Fleetwood Town F.C. players
English Football League players
National League (English football) players
Aberdeen F.C. players
Scottish Professional Football League players